Glabrocyphella is a genus of fungi in the family Marasmiaceae. The widespread genus contains 13 species.

Species

See also
List of Marasmiaceae genera

References

Marasmiaceae
Agaricales genera